Adobe ColdFusion Builder is the name for Adobe's Eclipse-based development IDE that can be used to build applications for ColdFusion. The product's original codename, "Bolt", is a reference to the original lightning icon for ColdFusion from the Allaire days. In 2010, Adobe released the product and officially renamed it Adobe ColdFusion Builder, often referred to as CFBuilder.

Version history

Adobe ColdFusion Builder 1.0 
ColdFusion Builder became available on March 22, 2010, along with Flash Builder 4.

Features include:
 Object Relational Mapping auto-configuration
 Application Code Generation
 Server management
 Easily extensible through the Eclipse framework
 CFML, HTML, JavaScript, and CSS syntax highlighting
 Code assist for tags, functions, variables, and components
 Code folding
 Snippet creation and management
 Outline viewing
 RDS Explorer for files and databases
 Line-level Debugging
 Refactoring

Adobe ColdFusion Builder 2.0 
ColdFusion Builder 2.0 (codename "Storm") was confirmed and previewed at Adobe MAX 2010 by Adobe. Major features include improved code navigation, searching improvements, code formatting and automatic method stub creation. The product was officially released on May 3, 2011.

New Features:
Automatic insertion of required tag attributes.
Argument context information via code assist.
Custom and persistent code folding.
Jump to matching tag shortcuts.
Hover help for built-in tags, functions and UDFs.
Granular code formatting preferences.
Customized advanced find/replace specifically for CFML code.
Extension enhancements and callbacks for extending the IDE.
Task tags with TODO and FIXME notes

Adobe ColdFusion Builder 3.0 
ColdFusion Builder 3.0 (codename "Thunder") was officially released on April 29, 2014.

New Features:
CFML-based mobile app development
On-device debugging
Multidevice inspection
Code insight
Linux Support

Adobe ColdFusion Builder 2016 
ColdFusion Builder 2016 (3.1.3.300344) was officially released on February 16, 2016.

See also
Adobe Dreamweaver - non-CF specific web development IDE
HomeSite - previous official editor for CF.
List of Eclipse-based software

References 

Adobe Inc.
Adobe software
Integrated development environments
CFML programming language
Web development software